Familiar Strangers (formerly known as Pretzels & Pills) is a 2008 film about an American family going through the process of negotiating the changing relationships between parents and children, especially as those children grow into adulthood.

Plot
The film follows the Worthington family through a four-day Thanksgiving family gathering.  Brian, who has moved away and kept his distance for the past several years, is reluctantly returning for this family tradition carrying the baggage of conflict with his father, Frank.

Frank feels he has failed as a father, having lost the ability to connect with his maturing children.  When the children grew to adulthood and created their own identities and lives, Frank replaced them with his pets, new children “who never have to grow up”.

The film is populated by Frank and Brian, mother Dottie who holds the reins on this family beneath the surface, brother Kenny who as a twenty-something has not yet found his path, sister Erin who is struggling to find herself after a painful divorce, and Erin’s young daughter Maddy, truly wise beyond her years.

Through this story and the conflict and communication that occur, the Worthington family comes to recognize the friendship and love that can exist between parents and their adult children.

Cast
 Shawn Hatosy as Brian Worthington
 DJ Qualls as Kenny Worthington
 Tom Bower as Frank Worthington
 Nikki Reed as Allison
 Ann Dowd as Dottie Worthington
 Cameron Richardson as Erin Worthington
 Georgia Mae Lively as Maddy

References

External links
 

2008 films
2008 comedy-drama films
American comedy-drama films
Films set in Virginia
Films shot in Virginia
2000s English-language films
2000s American films